Shandong Stars may refer to:

Shandong Golden Stars, a men's basketball team based in Shandong
Shandong Six Stars, a women's basketball team based in Shandong